Tall-e Gorosneh is a village in Dorunak Rural District, Zeydun District, Behbahan County, Khuzestan Province, Iran. At the 2006 census, its population was 136, in 30 families.

References 

Populated places in Behbahan County